The Union Pacific Railroad 9000 Class was a class of 88 steam locomotives, built by ALCO for the Union Pacific between 1926 and 1930.

Wheel arrangement 
The Union Pacific 9000 class was the only class of steam locomotives with a 4-12-2 wheel arrangement ever to be built. Under the Whyte notation for the classification of steam locomotives, the locomotives had four leading wheels, twelve coupled driving wheels, and two trailing wheels. As the Union Pacific was the only operator of this wheel arrangement, it was often nicknamed the Union Pacific type.

Other equivalent classifications are:
AAR wheel arrangement: 2-F-1
UIC classification: 2′F1′  (also known as German classification and Italian classification)
French classification: 261
Turkish classification: 69
Swiss classification: 6/9

History

These locomotives were used to increase the speed of freight trains in flat country, and were fairly successful, but had very high maintenance requirements, largely because of their use of an inside third cylinder driving the cranked second driving axle between the frames. There was no inside valve gear, however. ALCO had obtained permission to use the conjugated valve gear invented in the UK by Sir Nigel Gresley, who was the chief mechanical engineer of the London and North Eastern Railway. This system used two hinged levers connected to the outer cylinder's valves to operate the inner cylinder's valve. The 9000 class locomotives were the largest to use Gresley gears.

Between 1934 and 1940, eight of the first fifteen locomotives had their Gresley gear removed and were converted to a "double Walschaerts" valve gear, which utilized a double eccentric (return) crank and second link on the right side (similar to the gear Baldwin used on its three-cylinder experimental compound 4-10-2 No. 60000), which operated the valve for the inside cylinder.  Union Pacific referred to this system as the "third link". The 4-12-2s constructed from 1928 utilized roller bearings in the Gresley lever bearings, thus none of these engines were converted. The pre-1928 engines not converted received the roller bearing levers in 1940, and no further conversions were made.

During design, the third and fourth driving axles were planned to be "blind" (flangeless) in order to improve curve handling, but ALCO's lateral motion devices on the first and sixth axles (which allowed the axles to slide up to two inches to the side) made this unnecessary. They had the longest rigid wheelbase in North America, and the longest in the world until the Soviet Union built their AA20 4-14-4 locomotive in 1934. The trailing truck carried the same axle load as the drivers, which was unusual.

There has been debate as to whether the first driving axle of the 4-12-2 was cranked to provide clearance for the main rod connected to the second axle. Union Pacific drawings show no such crank on the first axle. The rod centerline is closest to the axle when the crank is 54.49 degrees below horizontal.)

Only one example has survived into preservation. Union Pacific 9000, the prototype of the class, is preserved at the Railway and Locomotive Historical Society's museum at the Los Angeles County Fairplex in Pomona, California. It received new boiler paint in 2006-2007.

References 
 
 
 
 
 

12,4-12-2
Railway locomotives introduced in 1926
Steam locomotives of the United States
UP
ALCO locomotives
Freight locomotives